"Coming with You" is a song performed by American recording artist Ne-Yo, taken from his sixth studio album, Non-Fiction (2015). It was sent to rhythmic radio on April 7, 2015 as the album's third official single.

Background
The song premiered December 15, 2014 before its official release. It was made available for pre-order via iTunes Store on January 5, 2015. It charted internationally prior to its release as a single.

Track listing
Digital download
"Coming with You" – 4:20

Charts

Release history

References

2015 singles
2015 songs
Ne-Yo songs
Motown singles
Song recordings produced by Stargate (record producers)
Songs written by Ne-Yo
Songs written by Tor Erik Hermansen
Songs written by Mikkel Storleer Eriksen
Music videos directed by Colin Tilley